Limosella australis, common name Welsh mudwort, is an annual dicot plant that is indigenous to the United States and Canada. It has white flowers, and blooms between July to October. Its habitat is tidal mudflats, muddy or sandy shores It is listed as a special concern species in Connecticut.

References

Flora of the United States
Flora of Canada
Scrophulariaceae